In Greek mythology, Polyidus  ( Polúeidos, "seeing many things"; also Polyeidus), son of Coeranus, was a famous seer from Corinth.

Family

Polyidus was a descendant of another renowned seer, Melampus. Given that Melampus had two sons, Abas and Mantius, different sources made Coeranus, father of Polyidus, son or grandson of either of the two. Briefly, the two alternate lineages were:

 Melampus– Abas– Coeranus– Polyidus
 Melampus– Mantius– Cleitus– Coeranus– Polyidus

According to a scholiast on Homer' s Iliad, Polyidus had two sons, Euchenor and Cleitus, by Eurydameia, daughter of Phyleus. Pausanias makes Polyeidus father of Coeranus, Manto and Astycrateia, and calls Euchenor his grandson through Coeranus.

Mythology

Glaucus

The best known myth concerning Polyidus is the one that deals with him saving the life of Glaucus, which runs as follows. One day, Glaucus, son of King Minos and Queen Pasiphaë of Crete, was playing with a mouse and suddenly disappeared. The Kuretes told Minos: "A marvelous creature has been born amongst you: whoever finds the true likeness for this creature will also find the child."

They interpreted this to refer to a newborn calf in Minos' herd.  Three times a day, the calf changed color from white to red to black. Polyidus ( or Asclepius, god of medicine) observed the similarity to the ripening of the fruit of the mulberry or the blackberry, and Minos sent him to find Glaucus.

Searching for the boy, Polyidus saw an owl driving bees away from a wine-cellar in Minos' palace.  Inside the wine-cellar was a cask of honey, with Glaucus dead inside.  Minos demanded Glaucus be brought back to life and shut Polyidus up in the wine-cellar with a sword. When a snake appeared nearby, Polyidus killed it with the sword.  Another snake came for the first, and after seeing its mate dead, the second serpent left and returned with an herb which then brought the first snake back to life. With the herb Polyidus resurrected the child.

Minos refused to let Polyidus leave Crete until he taught Glaucus the art of divination.  Polyidus did so, but then, at the last second before leaving, he asked Glaucus to spit in his mouth.  Glaucus did so and forgot everything he had been taught.

The story of Polyidus and Glaucus was the subject of a lost play of Euripides, his Bellerophon, and of one by Aeschylus, and Sophocles' lost The Mantises.

Other stories

It is related that Polyidus advised Bellerophon as to how to find and tame Pegasus, in order to kill the Chimera.

Polyidus was said to have come to Megara to purify Alcathous, son of Pelops, for the accidental murder of the latter's son Callipolis. The tomb of his two daughters was shown at Megara.

Polyidus also appears in one of the stories collected in Pseudo-Plutarch's On Rivers: he explains to Lysippe, mother of Teuthras, the source of her son's insanity.

Notes

References 

 Apollodorus, The Library with an English Translation by Sir James George Frazer, F.B.A., F.R.S. in 2 Volumes, Cambridge, MA, Harvard University Press; London, William Heinemann Ltd. 1921. ISBN 0-674-99135-4. Online version at the Perseus Digital Library. Greek text available from the same website.
 Gaius Julius Hyginus, Fabulae from The Myths of Hyginus translated and edited by Mary Grant. University of Kansas Publications in Humanistic Studies. Online version at the Topos Text Project.
 Lucius Mestrius Plutarchus, Morals translated from the Greek by several hands. Corrected and revised by. William W. Goodwin, PH. D. Boston. Little, Brown, and Company. Cambridge. Press Of John Wilson and son. 1874. 5. Online version at the Perseus Digital Library.
 Pausanias, Description of Greece with an English Translation by W.H.S. Jones, Litt.D., and H.A. Ormerod, M.A., in 4 Volumes. Cambridge, MA, Harvard University Press; London, William Heinemann Ltd. 1918. . Online version at the Perseus Digital Library
 Pausanias, Graeciae Descriptio. 3 vols. Leipzig, Teubner. 1903.  Greek text available at the Perseus Digital Library.

Mythological Greek seers
Corinthian characters in Greek mythology
LGBT themes in Greek mythology